Alan Turing, sometimes spelled Allen Turing and also known as Allen Turing Gargoyle, is an outdoor 1988 hammered copper sheet sculpture of Alan Turing by Wayne Chabre, installed on the exterior of Deschutes Hall on the University of Oregon campus in Eugene, Oregon, in the United States. The portrait face in high relief measures approximately  x  x  and cost $2,500. Its condition was undetermined when the Smithsonian Institution surveyed the work as part of its "Save Outdoor Sculpture!" program in March 1993.

See also

 1988 in art
 Alan Turing Memorial (2001), Manchester, England
 Alan Turing statue (2007), Bletchley Park, England

References

1988 establishments in Oregon
1988 sculptures
Busts in Oregon
Copper sculptures in Oregon
Cultural depictions of Alan Turing
Monuments and memorials in Eugene, Oregon
Monuments and memorials to scientists
Outdoor sculptures in Eugene, Oregon
Sculptures by Wayne Chabre
Sculptures of men in Oregon
University of Oregon campus